Transition metal isocyanide complexes are coordination compounds containing isocyanide ligands.  Because isocyanides are relatively basic, but also good pi-acceptors, a wide range of complexes are known.  Some isocyanide complexes are used in medical imaging.

Scope of isocyanide ligands

Several thousand isocyanides are known, but the coordination chemistry is dominated by a few ligands. Common isonitrile ligands are methyl isocyanide, tert-butyl isocyanide, phenyl isocyanide, and cyclohexylisocyanide.

Isocyanides are electronically similar to CO, but for most R groups, isocyanides are superior Lewis bases and weaker pi-acceptors.  Trifluoromethylisocyanide is the exception, its coordination properties are very similarly to those of CO.

Because the CNC linkage is linear, the cone angle of these ligands is small, so it is easy to prepare polyisocyanide complexes. Many complexes of isocyanides show high coordination numbers, e.g. the eight-coordinate cation .  Very bulky isocyanide ligands are also known, e.g. C6H3-2,6-Ar2-NC (Ar =aryl).

Di- and triisocyanide ligands are well developed, e.g., (CH2)n(NC)2. .  Usually steric factors force these ligands to bind to two separate metals, i.e., they are binucleating ligands. Chelating diisocyanide ligands require elaborate backbones.

Synthesis

Because of their low steric profile and high basicity, isocyanide ligands often install easily, e.g. by treating metal halides with the isocyanide.  Many metal cyanides can be N-alkylated to give isocyanide complexes.

Reactions
Typically, isocyanides are spectator ligands, but their reduced and oxidized complexes can prove reactive by virtue of the unsaturated nature of the ligand

Cationic complexes are susceptible to nucleophilic attack at carbon. In this way, the first metal carbene complexes where prepared.  Because isocyanides are both acceptors and donors, they stabilize a broader range of oxidation states than does CO.  This advantage is illustrated by the isolation of the homoleptic vanadium hexaisocyanide complex in three oxidation states, i.e., [V(CNC6H3-2,6-Me2)6]n for n = -1, 0, +1.

Because isocyanides are more basic donors ligands than CO, their complexes are susceptible to oxidation and protonation.  Thus,  is easily protonated, whereas its counterpart  is not:
Fe(CNR)5  +  H+  →  [HFeL5]+
Fe(CO)5  +  H+  → no reaction
Some electron-rich isocyanide complexes protonate at N to give aminocarbyne complexes:
LnM-CNR  +  H+  →  [LnM≡CN(H)R]+
Isocyanides sometimes insert into metal-alkyl bonds to form iminoacyls.

Structure and bonding
Isocyanide complexes often mirror the stoichiometry and structures of metal carbonyls. Like CO, isocyanides engage in pi-backbonding. The M-C-N angle provides some measure of the degree of backbonding.  In electron-rich complexes, this angle is usually deviates from 180°. Unlike CO, cationic and dicationic complexes are common. RNC ligands are typically terminal, but bridging RNC ligands are common. Bridging isocyanides are always bent. General trends can be appreciated by inspection of the homoleptic complexes of the first row transition metals.

Homoleptic complexes

IR spectroscopy
The νC≡N band in isocyanides is intense in the range of 2165–2110 cm−1. The value of νC≡N is diagnostic of the electronic character of the complex. In complexes where RNC is primarily a sigma donor ligand, νC≡N shifts to higher energies vs free isocyanide. In contrast, for the electron-rich species Fe2(CNEt)9, νC≡N = 2060, 1920, 1701, 1652 cm−l.

See also
 Cyanometalate - coordination compounds containing cyanide ligands (coordinating via C)
 Transition metal nitrile complexes - coordination compounds containing nitrile ligands, which are isomers of isonitriles

References

Coordination complexes
Isocyanides